The Mill Covered Bridge is a wooden covered bridge that crosses the North Branch Lamoille River on Back Road in Belvidere, Vermont.  Built about 1890, it is one of two surviving covered bridges in the rural community. It was listed on the National Register of Historic Places in 1974.

Description and history
The Mill Covered Bridge stands in a rural area west of the village center of Belvidere, carrying Back Road (which runs west from the town north of the river) to its junction with Vermont Route 109 (which runs west from the town south of the river). Its trusses are set on abutments of dry laid stone that have been capped in concrete. They are set slightly skewed, giving the bridge a parallelogram shape. The exterior of the bridge is finished in vertical board siding, which extends around to the insides of the portals. The siding ends short of the roof on the sides, leaving an open strip. The north portal opening is framed as a segmented-arch opening, while that on the south end is rectangular with diagonal corners. The bridge deck is wooden planking laid in steel I-beams, which now carry the bridge's active load.

The bridge was built by Lewis Robinson in about 1890.  It is one of two bridges in Belvidere (the other, the Morgan Covered Bridge, is east of this one), and one of five bridges across the North Branch Lamoille in a span of five miles.  The steel beams were installed under the deck of the bridge in 1971 after a contractor's snowplow broke through.  The trusses were repaired in 1995 by Jan Lewandoski and Paul Ide.

See also
National Register of Historic Places listings in Lamoille County, Vermont
List of Vermont covered bridges
List of bridges on the National Register of Historic Places in Vermont

References

Buildings and structures in Belvidere, Vermont
Bridges completed in 1890
Covered bridges on the National Register of Historic Places in Vermont
Wooden bridges in Vermont
Covered bridges in Lamoille County, Vermont
National Register of Historic Places in Lamoille County, Vermont
Road bridges on the National Register of Historic Places in Vermont
Lattice truss bridges in the United States
1890 establishments in Vermont